Moridilla brockii is a species of sea slug, an aeolid nudibranch, a marine gastropod mollusc in the family Facelinidae.

This species is considered a nomen dubium.

Distribution
The type locality of Moridilla brockii is the Sunda Sea which is an old name for the Flores Sea. This species is considered to be widespread in the Indo-Pacific region. It was redescribed from the Gulf of Mannar, India.

References 

Facelinidae
Gastropods described in 1888